Amber Jo Hill (born 21 August 1997) is an English sport shooter who specialises in skeet. She has won a total of three gold medals in a major international competition, spanning the ISSF World Cup series (2013 and 2015), and the inaugural European Games held in Baku, Azerbaijan. A member of the British national team, Hill trains under the tutelage of her personal coach Joe Neville at E.J. Churchill Shooting Ground in Wycombe.

Biography
Hill began shooting at the age of ten when she decided to go to the firing range in Binfield with the encouragement of her grandfather, Bill Rogers. Since then, she has taken part in small shooting competitions across Berkshire county, earning numerous age group titles and records for shotgun. By the age of twelve, Hill had been selected to England's senior women's team with a speciality in skeet shooting.

In 2013, Hill made shooting history by becoming the sport's youngest ever winner (aged 15) at the ISSF World Cup series. She prevailed over Italy's Diana Bacosi in a shoot-off 15 clays to 11 to secure a gold medal and establish a junior world record at her very first career attempt. Because of her noteworthy success and talent in the sport, Hill finished the season as the top-ranked senior for Great Britain and the world ranked number five in the leaderboard. She had also been named the BBC's Young Sports Personality of the Year.

At the 2015 European Games in Baku, Azerbaijan, Hill beat her Italian rival Bacosi in a lengthy, tense 30-clay shoot-off to claim the top spot on the podium in the women's skeet. By winning the gold on her senior international debut, Hill gained another Olympic quota place for Great Britain. A few months later she added another title to her career treasury at the World Cup Final in Nicosia, Cyprus, outclassing Thailand's Sutiya Jiewchaloemmit with a score of 15 to 13 hits.

Amber Hill competed for Team GB's shooting squad in the women's skeet at the 2016 Summer Olympics in Rio de Janeiro. She was selected for England's Commonwealth Games squad bound for Australia in April 2018. Hill was selected for Team GB's shooting squad in the women's skeet at the 2020 Summer Olympics, but had to withdraw after testing positive for COVID-19.

In July 2022, Hill became the most successful Briton in international shooting when she won the silver medal at the 2022 World Cup in Changwon, South Korea. This was her 11th international medal surpassing the 10 of Richard Faulds.

References

External links

1997 births
Living people
British female sport shooters
Shooters at the 2014 Commonwealth Games
Shooters at the 2015 European Games
Skeet shooters
Sportspeople from Windsor, Berkshire
People educated at Claires Court School
European Games gold medalists for Great Britain
European Games medalists in shooting
Olympic shooters of Great Britain
Shooters at the 2016 Summer Olympics
Commonwealth Games medallists in shooting
Commonwealth Games silver medallists for England
Shooters at the 2019 European Games
Shooters at the 2018 Commonwealth Games
Medallists at the 2018 Commonwealth Games